Rachel Zawadi Luttrell (born 19 January 1971) is a Tanzanian-Canadian actress best known for her role as Teyla Emmagan, an Athosian warrior leader on Stargate Atlantis.

Early life 
Luttrell was born 19 January 1971, in Dar Es Salaam, Tanzania, the daughter of Veronica Makihio Shenkunde Luttrell of the Washambala tribe of the Usambara Mountains, and Dr. William Leon Luttrell from Bossier City, Louisiana.  She is one of four daughters. Her family emigrated to Canada when she was five years old, and she was raised in Toronto. Her family has several musical roots; her father, a former member of the critically acclaimed Toronto Mendelssohn Choir, trained Luttrell's soprano voice. She studied ballet at the Russian Academy of Classical Ballet School and also studied piano at The Royal Conservatory of Music in Toronto.

Career 
Luttrell made her professional debuts in Canada's premier production of Miss Saigon in Toronto, and as "The Enchantress" in the Canadian production of Disney's Beauty and the Beast. She would go on to appear in many other stage productions, such as Once On This Island, Goblin Market, and the premier performance of Pulitzer Prize–winning playwright Lynn Nottage's Las Meninas. 

Following a move to Los Angeles, Luttrell became frustrated with some of the minor roles she was offered to her at the time, and considered giving up on her acting career to enroll at the UCLA to study architecture. She ventured to the UK instead and studied at the British American Drama Association on a midsummer course at Balliol College, Oxford.

In 2004, Luttrell was cast in a main role as Athanosian warrior-leader Teyla Emmagan on Stargate Atlantis. She remained in this role for 99 episodes until the end of the season five in 2009.

She also appeared in the Canadian movie A Dog's Breakfast, which was directed by her Stargate Atlantis co-star David Hewlett.

In 2011 Luttrell ventured into jazz music, releasing her first album I Wish You Love, produced by Gerrit Kinkel and featuring artists like double bass player Jennifer Leitham, Graham Dechter, and Konrad Paszkudzki, and drummer Jeff Hamilton.

Personal life 
Luttrell is married to Loyd Bateman, a former stunt performer; they have two children together, her son Caden (born 2007) and daughter Ridley (born 2012). Luttrell has two younger sisters, Erica Luttrell, who is also an actress, and Amanda Luttrell Garrigus, who is an on-air personality for fashion and entertainment. Luttrell is sometimes credited as "Rachel Z. Luttrell".

Filmography

Film

Television

References

External links 

One on One with Rachel Luttrell Interview with Luttrell about her career and season four of Stargate Atlantis

1971 births
Living people
People from Dar es Salaam
Canadian people of American descent
Actresses from Toronto
Tanzanian emigrants to Canada
Canadian people of Tanzanian descent
Canadian television actresses
Black Canadian actresses